

The LAK-19 is a Lithuanian single-seat Standard-class sailplane manufactured by Sportinė Aviacija.

Design and development
The LAK-19 is a single-seat standard-class sailplane manufactured in Lithuania by Sportinė Aviacija. It is designed to meet the requirements of the utility category of JAR-22.
It is a mid-wing glider with a T-tail and retractable main landing gear. Interchangeable outer wing panels are provided to enable it to fly with a span of either 15 or 18 metres.

The sailplane  is of composite construction using materials such as kevlar, carbon and glass fibre. The wing spar is of carbon fibre. The weight of each wing panel is about 55 kg. Schempp-Hirth airbrakes are mounted on the upper surfaces. It is capable of carrying 180 litres (47 gallons) of water ballast.
All controls, including the water ballast system, hook up automatically. The one-piece canopy hinges forward.

The LAK-19 was based on the design of the earlier LAK-17, but is not fitted with flaps. It was first flown on 30 July 2001, and was certified on 31 May 2002 by the Lithuanian Civil Aviation Authority.

Variants
LAK-19
Production 15- or 18-metre wingspan sailplane. Both variants can also be fitted with or without winglets.
LAK-19T
Powered self-sustaining sailplane variant of the LAK-19 with a Solo 2350B two-cylinder air-cooled two-stroke retractable engine.

Specifications (LAK-19 with 15 metre wingspan)

See also

References

External links
 Sportinė Aviacija
 EASA Type Certificate data sheet

Glider aircraft
LAK aircraft
Aircraft first flown in 2001